The Laxiwa Dam is an arch dam on the Yellow River in Qinghai Province, northwest China. The main purpose of the dam is hydroelectric power generation and it supports the largest station in the Yellow River basin.

Construction
By the beginning of 2004, the Yellow River was diverted and in September of that year, excavation on the dam's abutment began. In April 2006, the first concrete was cast and on May 18, 2009, the power plant's first two generators were commissioned.

See also 

 List of power stations in China
 List of tallest dams in the world
 List of tallest dams in China
 List of dams and reservoirs in China

References 

Hydroelectric power stations in Qinghai
Amdo
Buildings and structures in Qinghai
Dams on the Yellow River
Dams in China
Dams completed in 2009
Guide County